Russ Russell is a British record producer, sound engineer, mixer, mastering engineer, musician and writer.  He has worked all over the world and now is mostly based at Parlour Studios in the UK. He was also the guitarist in the psychedelic band Draw, and now plays in British metal band Absolute Power and cosmic mind metal trio, Reformat.

Although working in many different styles of music, Russell is now mostly known for his work in rock and metal working with bands such as Napalm Death, Dimmu Borgir, At the Gates, The Wildhearts, The Exploited, Evile, The Haunted, Lock Up, Defecation, Meathook Seed, The Berzerker, The Rotted, Space Ritual, Primitive Graven Image, Nuclear, Absolute Power, Leng Tch'e, Nekkrosis, The Ga Ga's, Sikth, Amorphis, New Model Army, Shrapnel, Luna Riot, Eradikator, Heretic, Evil Scarecrow, and many more.

References

External links
Russ Russell Myspace
A feature and video interview at recordproduction.com
Audio Authority Management
Russ Russell's Recording Studio

British record producers
British audio engineers
Living people
Heavy metal producers
People from Kettering
Year of birth missing (living people)